Charles Rackstraw (born 23 April 1938) is an English former professional footballer. Born in Sheffield, his clubs included Chesterfield, Bradford City and Gillingham.  He made 370 appearances in the Football League and scored 100 goals.

References

1938 births
Living people
English footballers
Footballers from Sheffield
Gillingham F.C. players
Chesterfield F.C. players
Bradford City A.F.C. players
Bradford (Park Avenue) A.F.C. players
Altrincham F.C. players
Association football forwards